Kallapuliyur is a village in the Gingee taluk of Villupuram district, Tamil Nadu, India.

Demographics 

As per the 2001 census, Kallapuliyur had a total population of 2082 with 1065 males and 1018 females. The sex ratio was 955. The literacy rate was 64.4

References 

 

Villages in Thanjavur district